The Office is a British television mockumentary sitcom first broadcast in the UK on BBC Two on 9 July 2001. Created, written and directed by Ricky Gervais and Stephen Merchant, the programme follows the day-to-day lives of office employees in the Slough branch of the fictional Wernham Hogg paper company. Gervais also starred in the series, playing the central character David Brent.

Two six-episode series were made, followed by a two-part Christmas special. When it was first shown on BBC Two, ratings were relatively low, but it has since become one of the most successful of all British comedy exports. As well as being shown internationally on BBC Worldwide, channels such as BBC Prime, BBC America, and BBC Canada, the series has been sold to broadcasters in over 80 countries, including ABC1 in Australia, The Comedy Network in Canada, TVNZ in New Zealand, and the pan-Asian satellite channel Star World, based in Hong Kong. The show was shown in the United States on BBC America from 2001 to 2016, and later on Cartoon Network's late night programming block Adult Swim from 2009 to 2011.

The show centres on themes of social clumsiness, the trivialities of human behaviour, self-importance and conceit, frustration, desperation and fame. The success of The Office led to a number of localised adaptations (based upon its basic story and themes) being produced for the television markets of other nations, resulting in an international Office franchise, including the successful and Emmy-winning American remake on NBC starring Steve Carell as David Brent's counterpart, Michael Scott.

Premise
The show is a mockumentary based in a branch of a large paper company called Wernham Hogg (where "life is stationery"), in the Slough Trading Estate in Berkshire. Slough is a large town immortalised for its lack of appeal by John Betjeman in his poem "Slough" ("Come, friendly bombs and fall on Slough/It isn't fit for humans now...").
The office is headed by general manager David Brent (Gervais), aided by his team leader and Assistant to the Regional Manager Gareth Keenan, played by Mackenzie Crook. Much of the series' comedic success stems from Brent, who frequently makes attempts to win favour with his employees and peers with embarrassing or disastrous results. Brent's character flaws are used to comic effect, including numerous verbal gaffes, inadvertent racism and sexism, and other social faux pas.

The other main plot line of the series concerns the unassuming Tim Canterbury (Martin Freeman) and his relationship with bored receptionist Dawn Tinsley (Lucy Davis). Their flirtation soon builds to a mutual romantic attraction, despite her engagement to dour and laddish warehouse worker Lee (Joel Beckett).

Cast and characters

Main
 Ricky Gervais as David Brent:The general manager of the Slough branch of Wernham Hogg paper merchants. Boorish and ignorant, he believes he is a lovable rogue in the business world and a Renaissance man, talented in philosophy, music and comedy. Although he thinks he is humorous, friendly and respected, others perceive him as offensive, childish and inconsiderate. His socially awkward behaviour comes across as he bumbles around the office – always hovering around the camera – telling rude jokes, performing awful impressions, and generally getting into trouble by talking before thinking. Brent thinks he is a tolerant, politically correct hero, but his preoccupation with this position, and the discrepancy between it and his often shocking jokes, get him into trouble. His lack of awareness regarding his ineptitude, lack of trust from colleagues, constant need of approval, and his failing way of trying to stay out of trouble are the driving plot points of the series.
 Martin Freeman as Tim Canterbury:A sales representative at Wernham Hogg. Unlike David, Tim is funny and patient. His humour and good nature make him one of the most likeable employees in the office, but at 30 he still lives with his parents and works at a job he hates. He maintains his sanity by pursuing an unlikely romance with receptionist Dawn Tinsley and playing practical jokes on Gareth. Although he wishes to leave Wernham Hogg to study psychology, his anxiety prevents him from taking any significant action. During Series One and Two, he also fails to further pursue a relationship with Dawn. Chosen as David's successor at the end of Series 2, he declines and lets Gareth take the position, which, however, does not keep him from playing pranks on Gareth.
 Mackenzie Crook as Gareth Keenan:Tim's vindictive deskmate and enemy. Gareth is a cold-hearted jobsworth with no good personality traits. He is obsessed with his military service in the Territorial Army and angers Tim with his outlandish comments. He takes pride in being "Team Leader", not realising his title is meaningless, and he imposes the little authority he has on his co-workers. He is selfish and intolerant. Tim and Dawn repeatedly insinuate homosexuality through questioning him about his military experience using double entendres. Apparently proud of his close connections with David and ignoring David's poor treatment of him, he later – during the Christmas special – gets back at David by humiliating him in front of the cameras.
 Lucy Davis as Dawn Tinsley:The company receptionist and Brent's dogsbody. She frequently has to put up with his attempts at humour and social interaction. Like her friend and co-worker Tim, she is aware of the miserable state of her life – she has been in an unhappy engagement with her fiancé Lee, a boorish warehouse worker, and gave up illustrating children's books to pursue her current pointless career. During the Christmas special, Dawn and Lee return from their illegally prolonged US vacation. She finally leaves Lee for the long-suffering Tim, after he encourages her to hold on to her dream of being a children's book illustrator, an ambition which Lee sought to put down at every opportunity.
 Stirling Gallacher as Jennifer Taylor-Clarke:Previously Brent's immediate superior in Series one. Nicknamed Camilla Parker Bowles by him, she is a strait-laced professional, and Brent's behaviour and lacklustre style of management are shown to be puerile and ineffectual by contrast, with Jennifer repeatedly reprimanding David for inappropriate behaviour. At the end of Series One she is made a partner in the firm, with Neil Godwin becoming David's immediate superior in Series 2.
 Oliver Chris as Ricky Howard:Introduced as Brent's new temp in the pilot, and a recent graduate. He was prominently featured in episode three, where he and Tim form a team for trivia night. The two end up winning, successfully answering a tie-breaker question on Shakespeare against Finch. His past experiences at game shows, including winning Blockbusters, causes Finch to wind him up after beating him and Tim at "Throwing" claiming "Screw Blockbusters, Screw Bob Holness and screw your Gold Run!".
 Ralph Ineson as Chris "Finchy" Finch:A "bloody good" outside sales representative. He is the only character in the series who is genuinely and unashamedly mean-spirited. He is imposingly intimidating, rasping-voiced with a natural flair for bullying others with arrogant, cruel personal attacks, Brent being his usual target. He likes to dominate conversations and is successful with women, but shows a poor attitude when he loses the staff quiz in Series One. David describes him as his "best friend" but actually acts more like a lackey, laughing at his jokes and attempting to impress him to feel popular only to be repaid with insults. Finch is such a bad loser at the quiz, he exclaims he and Brent can beat the team who beat them at many other things, so decides he can beat them at "Throwing", and if he throws anything they choose over the building, they will win the quiz and the champagne instead (which they eventually do, with Tim's shoe being the nominated object). In the Christmas Special, David finally stands up to Chris.
 Patrick Baladi as Neil Godwin:Brent's counterpart at the Swindon branch and eventually his immediate superior. He is young, suave, handsome and hard-working, a more successful manager than Brent, and has huge respect from staff. Brent is annoyed by and envious of him, and makes occasional, often immature attempts to either undermine or one-up him. He grows increasingly exasperated with Brent's immaturity, mistakes and inability to do his job properly and is therefore instrumental in David's redundancy.
 Stacey Roca as Rachel:A jovial and flirtatious co-worker who starts a relationship with Tim. After a deluded Gareth reveals his plans to seduce her, Tim is shocked when she begins to pressure him to make a greater commitment. He realises that his ongoing love for Dawn is far greater than his feelings for Rachel and breaks off the relationship.
 Elizabeth Berrington as Anne:Only appearing in the Christmas special, she is Tim's pregnant desk mate. She annoys him as she speaks continuously about herself and other topics no one else is interested in. She coldly tells David that no one is interested in his invitation to go out for a drink, causing discomfort amongst her co-workers. However, an encounter with Glynn at the office party causes her to run out of the office in tears.

Recurring

Introduced in Series 1
 Ewen MacIntosh as Keith Bishop: Keith works in the accounts department. Heavy set, slow-talking and apparently emotionless, he is a man of few words. When he does speak, his comments can be eloquent and sometimes disturbing.
 Joel Beckett as Lee: Dawn's fiancé who works in the company's warehouse. She met him in school and they have been together ever since. Lee is humourless, dull, and controlling. He often undermines and embarrasses Dawn, and is dismissive of her ideas of being an illustrator. His idea of a romantic proposal was a four-word notice in the newspaper — "Lee love Dawn. Marriage?". It is clear from an early stage that she stays with him out of a fear of loneliness rather than real love. Lee has a somewhat violent temper, which is shown when he holds Tim against a wall, simply for starting to dance with Dawn.
 David Schaal as Glynn aka Taffy: The misogynistic, sexist warehouse manager at the company and Lee's supervisor, who is seen as being very slack and has little respect for anyone who works outside the warehouse, particularly management.
 Robin Hooper as Malcolm: An older staff member, he is naturally most worried about the prospect of redundancies and therefore often challenges Brent's handling of the situation, criticising his relaxed attitude, lack of management ability and his unnecessary hiring of a personal secretary. Giving him the nickname Kojak, Brent openly dislikes Malcolm, sneering at his criticisms and openly lying about "faking" the high blood pressure that cost him a promotion and saved the Slough office from closure. He does not appear in Series Two, having presumably been made redundant (in an earlier scene where David Brent is falsely assuring employees one by one that their jobs are safe, he makes a point of briefly glancing at Malcolm and not saying anything to him, implying that David doesn't want Malcolm around and uniquely doesn't care what happens to him).
 Sally Bretton as Donna: Introduced in Series 1, episode 2 as the daughter of Brent's friends Ron and Elaine, who has come to work at the office. She makes a quick impact in the office, starting a relationship with Ricky, but fails to reciprocate Keenan's romantic feelings towards her.
 Nicola Cotter as Karen Roper: Brent's personal secretary, hired because he insists that he needs an assistant. Several of the staff are apprehensive about Brent hiring new and unnecessary personnel while the branch is facing downsizing and redundancies. She is not seen in Series Two due to David proclaiming she was 'Last in, first out'.

Introduced in Series 2
 Rachel Isaac as Trudy: Trudy is first introduced in Series Two as one of several of the new intake from the Swindon branch. She takes an immediate dislike to David and is particularly vocal about her disapproval of his offensive humour and laid-back style of management. She shows a lighter side during a booze-fuelled birthday celebration in her honour at the office, during which her casual, sexually charged nature does not go unnoticed by the male members of staff, with David  trying to take advantage of this only to be ignored. She is later shown engaging in sexual intercourse with Chris Finch in the car park.
 Howard Saddler as Oliver: Oliver is good-natured and tolerant, which is lucky for him as he is the only black person working in the office. Because of this he becomes the target for most of David's well-meaning but hideously misguided attempts to show what a politically correct and racially tolerant man he is.
 Julie Fernandez as Brenda: Brenda is a wheelchair user who is often the focus of David's attempts to portray himself as a tolerant and progressive person, instead only patronising her and demonstrating his igorance. She naturally brings out the worst in Brent and is not impressed by his patronising behaviour. Brenda serves to highlight the gap between Brent's vision of himself as a modern enlightened man and the reality of his ignorance and thoughtlessness, in instances such as during a fire frill, when she is stranded in her wheelchair on a stairwell when David and Gareth decide they cannot be bothered to carry her all the way down.

Guest

Introduced in Series 1
 Jamie Deeks as Jamie
 Ben Bradshaw as Ben - An older staff member, who is told to 'get out' by David after a lewd comment directed at Donna during her introduction (despite other similar comments by younger staff being received in good humour). He wears his shirt and tie on backward and has his trousers pulled down in the comic relief episode.
 Jane Lucas as Sheila - A shy member of staff that nonetheless dresses as Wonder Woman for comic relief. Sharing a desk with Oliver, she causes a shock when she says she 'likes blacks' when asked what men she would go for and can be seen crying at the Christmas party when Oliver is seen kissing another staff member.
 Emma Manton as Emma
 Ron Merchant as Gordon (caretaker) - Co-writer Stephen Merchant's father 
 Alexander Perkins as Ralph
 Phillip Pickard as Phillip
 Angela Clerkin as Jackie
 Yvonne D'Alpra as Joan (cleaner)
 Vincent Franklin as Rowan A training facilitator who is progressively frustrated by Brent's attempts to undermine and take control of a team training session, often forcing it to veer off track.

Introduced in Series 2
 Tom Goodman-Hill as Ray
 Jennifer Hennessy as Jude
 Matthew Holness as Simon: Working in IT, he visits the office to install firewall software on the computers while discussing his theories with Keenan about Bruce Lee faking his own death so that he could go undercover and fight the Triads. An arrogant show-off and boaster, he claims to be the record holder of the fastest lap down at 'SuperKarts', something which he claims experts have said would make him the best Formula 1 racer in the country.
 Stephen Merchant as Oggy aka 'The Ogg Monster': One of Gareth's best friends. His real name is Nathan.
 Bruce Mackinnon as Jimmy the Perv
 Tony MacMurray as Tony
 Olivia Colman as Helena: A reporter for the internal paper merchant newspaper "Inside Paper" who finds interviewing Brent quite difficult because he attempts to dictate what she should write in her article.
 Sandy Hendrickse as Carol: Brent's blind date with whom he hits it off and who seems to like him.

Episodes

Production

In June 1998 Merchant and Gervais made a 20 minute film starring Gervais entitled Seedy Boss as part of Merchant's TV producer training for the BBC. The pair had met when Merchant was hired as Gervais' assistant at radio station Xfm; neither had any previous television experience. Gervais' character in the film was based on one he would perform to amuse staff at the radio station.

Ash Atalla showed the tape to BBC Two head Jane Root who commissioned a series based on it. Filming took place in an office at Teddington Studios.

Unlike most British sitcoms The Office used a single-camera setup (where multiple-camera setups were traditional) and no laughter track. This production style influenced subsequent comedies such as Peep Show, Twenty Twelve, Fleabag and Motherland.

Music
The theme song for the show is "Handbags and Gladrags", arranged by Big George and originally written in the 1960s by Mike D'Abo, former vocalist for the rock group Manfred Mann. The song "Sitting" by Cat Stevens was also considered by Gervais and Merchant to be the theme song for the show but was later rejected. 

In Series 1, episode 4, a version performed by Gervais (in character as Brent) was featured over the end credits.

The first series also features Gervais performing "Free Love Freeway" and the Christmas Special includes him performing "If You Don't Know Me By Now".

Reception

Critical response
The show has received critical acclaim, and has been regarded as one of the greatest British sitcoms of all time. Series one currently holds a Metacritic score of 98 out of 100, based on 12 reviews, indicating "universal acclaim". Series two received similar acclaim, holding a Metacritic score of 93 out of 100, based on 16 reviews, indicating "universal acclaim". The Office Christmas specials were also well received, and hold a Metacritic score of 98 out of 100, based on 19 reviews, indicating "universal acclaim". The Office was named by The Telegraph as one of the 10 best TV sitcoms of all time. In 2019, the series was ranked 6th on The Guardian'''s list of the 100 best TV shows of the 21st century.

Accolades
At the British Comedy Awards in 2001, The Office won the Best New TV Comedy award. In 2002, the series won the Best TV Comedy award, and Gervais the Best TV Comedy Actor award.

In 2004, The Office won the Golden Globe Award for Best Television series: Musical or Comedy. It was the first British comedy in 25 years to be nominated for a Golden Globe, and the first ever to win one. Gervais was also awarded the Golden Globe For Best Actor in a Television series: Comedy or Musical. The same year, the series won a Peabody Award.

Legacy

The success of The Office led to a number of localised adaptations (based upon its basic story and themes) being produced for the television markets of other nations, resulting in an international Office franchise, including the successful and Emmy-winning American remake starring Steve Carell as David Brent's counterpart, Michael Scott.

Home video releases
 

Follow-ups
Television short
A Comic Relief charity short was made in 2013 entitled The Return of Brent (also known as The Office Revisited).

YouTube shorts
In 2013, Gervais developed a series of videos, and released them on his YouTube channel entitled "Learn Guitar with David Brent". Within three months, the series had collected over 2 million views.

Film

The Brent character also featured in the 2016 film David Brent: Life on the Road, this time with the contributions of Gervais but not Merchant.

Other media
In 2004, Microsoft UK commissioned two 20-minute corporate videos, entitled "The Office Values" and "Realising Potential", featuring David Brent being interviewed by Jeff (played by Stephen Merchant), a Microsoft employee who becomes increasingly exasperated by Brent's antics. Brent is obviously resentful of the company's success. He believes he has what it takes to become the next managing director of Microsoft and continually drops hints to that effect. While not on general release, the videos emerged on the Internet in 2006. The clips also appeared on certain peer-to-peer networks. Microsoft was unhappy with the leak, stating that the videos "were never intended to be viewed by the public". During the first video, Brent plays the guitar, the lyrics exasperating his ideas in opposition to Microsoft and technology.

References

Further reading
 De Jongste, Henri (2020) Playing with Mental Models: Humour in the BBC Comedy Series The Office. John Benjamins Publishing Company 
 Griffin, Jeffrey, “The Americanization of The Office: a comparison of the offbeat NBC sitcom and its British predecessor.” Journal of Popular Film and Television 35 (2008): 154–16
 Schwind, Kai Hanno. "‘Chilled-out entertainers’–multi-layered sitcom performances in the British and American version of The Office." Comedy Studies'' 5.1 (2014): 20–32.

External links

 
 
 
 

 
2000s British satirical television series
2000s British sitcoms
2000s British workplace comedy television series
2001 British television series debuts
2003 British television series endings
BBC satirical television shows
BBC television sitcoms
Best Musical or Comedy Series Golden Globe winners
British mockumentary television series
British workplace television series
Culture in Slough
English-language television shows
Peabody Award-winning television programs
Television series created by Ricky Gervais
Television series created by Stephen Merchant
Television shows set in Berkshire
Television shows shot at Teddington Studios